Uxue may refer to:

People 

 Uxue Barkos, Spanish politician and journalist
 Uxue Ezkurdia, Spanish handballer
 Uxue Garmendia, Spanish footballer
 Uxue Amaya Guereca Parra, Mexican volleyball player 
 Uxue Iparragirre, Spanish footballer

Other 

 Uxúe Bilbao, a former name for Spanish professional basketball club Bilbao Basket

Feminine given names
Basque feminine given names